When the Redskins Rode is a 1951 American historical Western film directed by Lew Landers and starring Jon Hall, Mary Castle and James Seay. The film is loosely based on the events leading up to the outbreak of the French and Indian War.

It was one of several films made during the decade that portrayed politics in Colonial America as a precursor to the westerns of the more common setting of the nineteenth century.

Synopsis
Williamsburg, 1753. Hannoc, a young prince of the Delaware, agrees to ally himself with the British against the French who are encroaching south from Canada. A French spy Elizabeth Leeds does everything she can to seduce Hannoc and prevent him from bringing his people into the war on the British side.

However, despite the appeals of his son, Hannoc's father Shingiss attempts to maintain neutral. Shingiss is disturbed that Hannoc has become too anglicised and abandoned native ways, including his rejection of his intended Delaware bride Morna. Eventually a French attack on their lands drive the Delawares into formal alliance with the Crown, and they arrive just in time to assist the beleaguered colonial garrison under George Washington at Fort Necessity.

Cast
 Jon Hall as Prince Hannoc 
 Mary Castle as Elizabeth Leeds 
 James Seay as Colonel George Washington
 John Ridgely as Christopher Gist
 Sherry Moreland as Morna 
 Pedro de Cordoba as Chief Shingiss 
 John Dehner as John Delmont 
 Lewis L. Russell as Governor Dinwiddie
 William Bakewell as Appleby 
 Jessie Arnold as Gossip at Wrestling Match 
 Jack Chefe as French Lieutenant 
 J.W. Cody as Mogama
 Gregory Gaye as St. Pierre 
 Charles Horvath as Michel, French Sentry 
 Milton Kibbee as Davey  
 Harold Miller as Man Seated in Tavern  
 Steve Pendleton as Appleby's Friend  
 Rick Vallin as Duprez  
 Rusty Wescoatt as Znueau

Production
Filming started 8 August 1950.

It was the first of five films to use Supercinecolor, a new three-strip color process from Cinecolor. It was one of several films Jon Hall made for Sam Katzman.

References

Bibliography
 David Eldridge. Hollywood's History Films. I.B.Tauris, 2006.
 Bertil O. Österberg. Colonial America on Film and Television: A Filmography. McFarland, 2000.

External links
When the Redskins Rode at TCMDB

1951 films
Columbia Pictures films
1951 Western (genre) films
American Western (genre) films
French and Indian War films
Cultural depictions of George Washington
1950s historical films
American historical films
Films set in 1753
Films set in Virginia
Films directed by Lew Landers
1950s English-language films
1950s American films